Aaron Bergeron is an American television writer and producer.

Career 
He was a writer for The Daily Show with Jon Stewart and D.L. Hughley Breaks the News, a producer for My Next Guest Needs No Introduction with David Letterman, and screenwriter for Terry Gilliam's The Legend of Hallowdega. He was also a special consultant for Jurassic World Dominion.

He has twice been nominated for an Emmy, in 2002 for The Daily Show and in 2018 for My Next Guest Needs No Introduction.

References

External links 

 

Year of birth missing (living people)
Living people
American television writers
American television producers